The 2018 Monza GP3 Series round was the seventh round of the 2018 GP3 Series. It was held on 1 and 2 September 2018 at Autodromo Nazionale Monza in Monza, Italy. The race supported the 2018 Italian Grand Prix.

Classification

Qualifying 

 Jannes Fittje disqualified as there was not enough fuel in his car to produce sample for scrutineers.

Feature race

Sprint race

Notes

References

|- style="text-align:center"
|width="35%"|Previous race:
|width="30%"|GP3 Series2018 season
|width="40%"|Next race:

Monza
GP3
GP3 Monza